Kose Parish is a rural municipality in northern Estonia. It is a part of Harju County. The population density is 24.2 inhabitants per km2.

In October 2013, neighbouring Kõue Parish was merged with Kose Parish.

Administrative centre of the Municipalities is the small borough of Kose. There are total of 5 small boroughs (Ardu, Habaja, Kose, Kose-Uuemõisa and Ravila) and 58 villages in Kose Parish:
Aela, Ahisilla, Äksi, Alansi, Harmi, Kadja, Kanavere, Kantküla, Karla, Kata, Katsina, Kirivalla, Kiruvere, Kolu, Kõrvenurga, Kõue, Krei, Kuivajõe, Kukepala, Laane, Leistu, Liiva, Lööra, Lutsu, Marguse, Nõmbra, Nõmmeri, Nõrava, Nutu, Ojasoo, Oru, Pala, Palvere, Paunaste, Paunküla, Puusepa, Rava, Raveliku, Riidamäe, Rõõsa, Saarnakõrve, Sääsküla, Sae, Saula, Sõmeru, Silmsi, Tade, Tammiku, Triigi, Tuhala, Uueveski, Vahetüki, Vanamõisa, Vardja, Vilama, Virla, Viskla and Võlle.

People
Stage actress Ester Pajusoo (born 1934) was born in Kose Parish

Religion 

(then Tuhala Parish)

Twin towns — sister cities
 Ócsa, Hungary
 Peräseinäjoki, Finland
 Plášťovce, Slovakia

Gallery

See also
Blue Springs of Saula

References

External links